The 2017 SGB Premiership was the 83rd season of the top division of British Speedway. It was the first time that it was known as the SGB Premiership after changing its name from the Elite League.

Summary
The season ran between March and October 2017 and 8 teams participated (Coventry withdrew from the league before the season started, after they had originally entered the league). The lineup of teams for 2017 was different from the lineup of the 2016 Elite League. The Lakeside Hammers and Coventry Bees dropped out of the league and were replaced by the Rye House Rockets and the Somerset Rebels.

At the annual Speedway AGM, which was held early in November 2016, it was agreed that speedway in Great Britain would be given what was described as "the biggest revamp of the sport in modern history". This involved numerous alterations to both the regulations and the branding of the sport. The former top level of British speedway, the Elite League, was replaced by the Speedway Great Britain Premiership. Among the most notable changes to the regulations is the reintroduction of promotion and relegation between the top two leagues: the team that finishes in last place in the Premiership will race against the winners of the new second tier of British speedway (the SGB Championship) in order to decide who will compete in the Premiership in 2018.

The Swindon Robins were the champions defeating the Wolverhampton Wolves in the Grand Final.

British TV broadcasting rights changed hands before the start of the 2017 SGB Premiership season, when Sky withdrew from their negotiated contract with the BSPA. BT then obtained the broadcasting rights for the 2017 season to be shown on their BT Sport channels.

League
Teams face each other four times: twice home and twice away. The first of the home and away meetings are called the 'A' fixtures, and the second are the 'B' fixtures.

Regular season

Final League Table

A Fixtures

B Fixtures

Play-offs
Draw

Home team scores are in Dark Black

Semi-Finals

Grand Final

Promotion and relegation play-off

Knockout Cup
The 2017 Knockout Cup was the 75th edition of the Knockout Cup for tier one teams. The competition returned after a four-year absence under a new name, it had previously been known as the Elite League Knockout Cup. Belle Vue Aces were the winners of the competition for a 14th time and extended their all time record.

Draw

Home team scores are in bold

Final

Elite Shield

Pairs Championship
A pairs championship was held for the top tier of speedway the first time since the Elite League Pairs Championship. last held in 2011. Despite its comeback for 2017 it was not held again afterwards.

Result

Semi Finals

Final

Final leading averages

Riders and final averages
Belle Vue Aces
 (8.98)
 (8.68) 
 (8.10)
 (7.63)
 (7.31)
 (6.48)
 (5.52)
 (2.24)

King's Lynn Stars
 (8.00)
 (8.00)
 (7.87)
 (6.73)
 (6.38)
 (6.19)
 (5.73)
 (5.45)
 (5.33)
 (4.91)
 (4.29)
 (2.74)
 (1.33)

Leicester Lions
 (7.60)
 (7.19)
 (6.53)
 (6.52)
 (6.27)
 (6.00) (1 match only)
 (5.78)
 (5.54)
 (5.00)
 (5.00) (2 matches only)
 (4.40)

Poole Pirates
 (8.47)
 (8.42)
 (7.80)
 (7.07)
 (6.92)
 (6.85)
 (6.60)
 (6.48)
 (6.43)
 (5.83)
 (5.23) (3 matches only)
 (4.71)
 (3.96)

Rye House Rockets
 (8.64)
 (8.47)
 (7.94)
 (7.31)
 (7.09)
 (6.93)
 (6.83)
 (5.23)
 (3.92)
 (3.29)
 (2.86) (2 matches only)

Somerset Rebels
 (7.53)
 (7.21)
 (6.79)
 (6.67)
 (6.16)
 (5.93)
 (5.61)
 (5.33)
 (4.59)
 (4.27)

Swindon Robins
 (10.26)
 (9.42)
 (8.32)
 (7.90)
 (6.27)
 (5.05)
 (5.86)
 (4.40) (2 matches only)
 (3.62)

Wolverhampton Wolves
 (9.95)
 (9.33)
 (8.61)
 (8.12)
 (7.78)
 (6.00)
 (3.75)
 (3.04)
 (2.25)
 (1.45)

See also
The second division of British speedway SGB Championship 2017
List of United Kingdom Speedway League Champions
Knockout Cup (speedway)

References

2017 in British motorsport
2017 in speedway
SGB Premiership 2017